FFI may refer to:

Entertainment
 Festival Film Indonesia, in Indonesian annual Film Festival
 Final Fantasy (video game), or Final Fantasy I, 1987 video game
 Final Fight (video game), 1989 fighting action video game

Organizations
 Family Firm Institute
 Fauna and Flora International, a conservation group
 Fellow of the Flag Institute
 Film Federation of India
 Finlay Forest Industries, a defunct Canadian forest products company
 Franciscan Friars of the Immaculate, a Roman Catholic institute of religious life
 Frederikshavn fI, a Danish sport club
 Free File, Inc., an American consortium of tax preparation companies
 French Forces of the Interior, French resistance fighters during World War II
 Fuel Freedom International, an American multi-level marketing company
 Norwegian Defence Research Establishment, a Norwegian military R&D institute

Science and technology
 Fatal insomnia, an extremely rare neurological disorder that leads to chronic insomnia and inevitable death
 Foreign function interface, in computing

Other uses
 , a typographical ligature
 Foia Foia language, spoken in Papua New Guinea